Korea DPR participated in the 2014 Asian Games in Incheon, South Korea from 19 September to 4 October 2014.

Background 

North Korea is a member of the Olympic Council of Asia and has competed in the Asian Games since the 1974 Asian Games in Tehran.

Medal summary

Medal table

Medalists

References

Medalists

Nations at the 2014 Asian Games
2014
Asian Games